Brazlândia is a municipality located in the Brazilian state of Mato Grosso do Sul. Its population was 11,853 (2020) and its area is 2.

The municipality contains the  Cisalpina Private Natural Heritage Reserve, created in 2016.

References

Municipalities in Mato Grosso do Sul